Cedrela fissilis is a species of tree in the family Meliaceae. It is native to Central and South America, where it is distributed from Costa Rica to Argentina. Its common names include Argentine cedar, cedro batata, cedro blanco, "Acaju-catinga" (its Global Trees entry)  and cedro colorado.

Once a common lowland forest tree, this species has been overexploited for timber and is now considered to be endangered. A few populations are stable, but many have been reduced, fragmented, and extirpated. The wood is often sold in batches with Cuban cedar (Cedrela odorata).

References

https://globaltrees.org/threatened-trees/trees/acaju-catinga/

External links

fissilis
Flora of Central America
Flora of northern South America
Flora of southern South America
Flora of western South America
Trees of South America
Endangered plants
Endangered flora of North America
Endangered flora of South America
Trees of Brazil
Trees of Peru
Trees of Argentina
Trees of Costa Rica
Taxonomy articles created by Polbot